Senator Holliday may refer to:

Cyrus K. Holliday (1826–1900), Kansas State Senate
Robert Holliday (1933–2014), West Virginia State Senate